Nor Zamani binti Abdol Hamid (born  1962) is a Malaysian civil servant and educator who served as the 18th Director-General of Education from 22 June 2021 to 29 July 2022.

Education 
She obtained a bachelor's degree in sociology and anthropology, as well as a master's degree in education at University of Malaya.

Career 
Zamani started her career as the Head of A-Level Department at Kolej Tunku Kurshiah in 1986. In her 35-year career at the Ministry of Education, she served various positions, including the Deputy Director-General of Education.

On 2 July 2021, the Ministry of Education announced that Zamani was appointed Director-General of Education on 22 June. She is the 3rd woman educator to hold the position, after Asiah Abu Samah and Habibah Abdul Rahim.

Honour 
  :
  Knight Commander of the Order of the Territorial Crown (PMW) – Datuk (2022)

References 

1962 births
Living people
Malaysian Muslims
Malaysian women academics
Malaysian educators
University of Malaya alumni